Eldridgeville is a small village in Toledo District, Belize.

Populated places in Toledo District